The See House is the rectory of St. Peter's Church, at 611 Lincoln Street in Sitka, Alaska.  It is a two-story wood-frame structure, designed by H. L. Duhring, Jr. of Philadelphia, Pennsylvania, and built in 1905 for Peter Trimble Rowe, the first Episcopal bishop of Alaska.  The design was completed in 1899, when the church was built, but a lack of funding prevented its immediate construction.  The house is, like the church, a fine local example of Gothic Revival architecture.

The house was listed on the National Register of Historic Places in 1978.

See also
National Register of Historic Places listings in Sitka City and Borough, Alaska

References

Houses on the National Register of Historic Places in Alaska
Houses completed in 1905
Houses in Sitka, Alaska
Buildings and structures on the National Register of Historic Places in Sitka, Alaska
1905 establishments in Alaska